Quattro Castella is a comune (municipality) in the Province of Reggio Emilia in the Italian region Emilia-Romagna, located about  west of Bologna and about  southwest of Reggio Emilia.

Quattro Castella borders the following municipalities: Albinea, Bibbiano, Reggio Emilia, San Polo d'Enza, Vezzano sul Crostolo.

Two of its churches include Sant'Antonino Martire in town; and  the Oratory of the Madonna della Battaglia outside of the town.

Twin towns
Quattro Castella is twinned with:

  Buzet, Croatia, since 1978
  Weilburg, Germany, since 2002

References

External links
 Official website

Cities and towns in Emilia-Romagna
Matilda of Tuscany